KSCU (103.3 FM) is a student-run radio station broadcasting a Variety format. Licensed to Santa Clara, California, the station serves the San Francisco Bay Area. The station is currently owned by Santa Clara University, and located on campus with studios in the basement (i.e. Underground Sound) of the Benson Center with a transmitter next door atop Swig Residence Hall.

KSCU plays independent music, varying from indie rock, punk, jazz, blues, electronic, and others. KSCU has been a radio station (with one name or another) for over 50 years.

References

External links
KSCU webpage

SCU
Santa Clara University
SCU
Mass media in San Jose, California